The 1997 Georgia Bulldogs football team represented the University of Georgia during the 1997 NCAA Division I-A football season The Bulldogs completed the season with a 10–2 record.

Schedule

Personnel

Season summary

vs. Florida

References

Georgia
Georgia Bulldogs football seasons
ReliaQuest Bowl champion seasons
Georgia Bulldogs football